Jousset is a French surname. Notable people with the surname include:

Frédéric Jousset (born 1970), French entrepreneur 
Marc Jousset, French Olympic sailor 

French-language surnames